The 2012–13 LEN Women's Champions' Cup was the 26th edition of LEN's premier competition for women's water polo clubs, running from 22 November 2012 to 27 April 2013. It was contested by twelve teams from nine countries, with Israel and the Netherlands replacing England and Serbia. There was no defending champion as Pro Recco renounced to the competition for disagreements with the FIN on the number of allowed foreign players in the Italian clubs' squads.

CN Sabadell defeated Kinef Kirishi in the final to win its second title. Vouliagmeni NC and Egri VK also reached the Final Four, which was hosted by the Hungarian team.

Group stage

Group A

Quarter-finals

Final four

References

LEN Euro League Women seasons
Women, Euro League
2012 in water polo
2013 in water polo
LEN
LEN